Series 38 of the quiz show University Challenge began on 7 July 2008 and was broadcast on BBC Two. This is a list of the matches played, their scores, and outcomes.

Main draw

 Winning teams are highlighted in bold.
 Teams with green scores (winners) returned in the next round, while those with red scores (losers) were eliminated.
 Teams with orange scores have lost, but survived as highest scoring losers.
 Teams with black scores have been disqualified.

First round

Highest scoring losers playoffs

Second round

Quarter-finals

Semi-finals

Final

 The trophy and title were originally awarded to the Corpus Christi team comprising Gail Trimble, Sam Kay, Lauren Schwartzman and James Marsden, but on 2 March 2009, the BBC in a joint statement with Granada announced that they had disqualified the team for "breaking the series rules". The title was therefore retrospectively awarded to the Manchester team consisting of Matthew Yeo, Henry Pertinez, Reuben Roy and Simon Baker. 
 The trophy was presented by Wendy Cope.

Notable events and press coverage
The 2009 series produced the two lowest team scores since the programme was revived by the BBC in 1994. 15 points were achieved by the University of Exeter in the third quarter-final against the later disqualified Corpus Christi College, Oxford, and 30 points were scored by Lincoln College, Oxford in a semi-final against University of Manchester. In the Exeter v. Corpus Christi match, Corpus Christi captain Gail Trimble answered a record fifteen starters correctly, leading to much interest on internet forums and in the popular press.

James Archer of King's College, Cambridge was questioned by police after wearing an RAF surplus jacket on the show—in combination with a dyed red mohican haircut—had prompted several complaints from viewers. Archer had obtained the jacket legally, and no further action was taken.

The final
The final, between Corpus Christi College and Manchester, was broadcast on 23 February 2009.  Before the final, press coverage focused on the Corpus Christi captain, Gail Trimble, who had gained an exceptionally high proportion of her team's points.  In the final, which was watched by more than 5 million viewers, the show's highest audience share since at least 2001, Trimble scored 125 points in the last four minutes to lead her team to what appeared at the time to be a clear victory. She was described in the British press as the "human Google", and by a defeated contestant as a "relentless juggernaut of intellectual Blitzkrieg".

A few days after the final was broadcast the BBC undertook an investigation into the eligibility of Corpus Christi team member Sam Kay, after it became evident that he had graduated in June 2008, before the filming of the quarter, semi-final and final matches, despite telling viewers he was studying chemistry. Kay left Corpus Christi after failing to get funding for his PhD and at the time of the final was working as an accountant. The captain of the Manchester team, Matthew Yeo, rejected calls for a rematch of the final. However, in a statement on 2 March 2009, the BBC and the programme's makers, Granada, stated that:"The University Challenge rules on student eligibility are that students taking part must be registered at their university or college for the duration of the recording of the series. Whilst obviously not intending to, Corpus Christi broke this important rule where other universities and colleges taking part adhered to it. We therefore find ourselves in the regrettable position of having no choice but to disqualify Corpus Christi from the final. This means they forfeit their hard-fought title which now goes to the Manchester University team."

Another member of the Corpus Christi team, James Marsden, criticised the BBC decision. He stated that the rules were ambiguous and did not state that students had to be registered at their college for the duration of filming. Gail Trimble was subsequently reported as saying that Corpus Christi, rather than Manchester, still had the trophy, "gathering dust somewhere".

References

External links
Blanchflower Results Table from blanchflower.org
A full account of the matches of the lowest-ever scoring team in the Paxman-era, by an Exeter contestant

2009
2008 British television seasons
2009 British television seasons
Corpus Christi College, Oxford